Wesley Roy Dunlop (born 12 May 1987) is a South African rugby union player, currently playing with US Montauban.

Career

Youth

Natal Sharks
In 2007, he moved to Durban, where the joined the  academy. In 2010, he was a member of the College Rovers club that won the National Club Championships.

Blue Bulls
He made several appearances for their Vodacom Cup team in 2011 and 2012. During the same period, he also played for the Varsity Cup side . He had a fantastic season in 2012, finishing as top scorer and also being voted the Player That Rocks.

Eastern Province Kings
He made his debut on 30 July 2012 in the opening game of the 2012 Currie Cup First Division season against , scoring five points in a 25–20 victory.

He was initially named in the  squad for the 2013 Super Rugby season, but was later released to the 2013 Vodacom Cup squad.

Montauban
In 2013 he joined US Montauban in French 3rd Division.

References

1987 births
Living people
Alumni of Grey High School
Blue Bulls players
Eastern Province Elephants players
Leopards (rugby union) players
Rugby union players from Durban
South African people of British descent
South African rugby union players
White South African people
Rugby union fly-halves